Scale analysis may refer to:

 Scale analysis (mathematics)
 Scale analysis (statistics)